The University of Engineering and Technology, Peshawar (UET Peshawar), formerly known as NWFP University of Engineering and Technology, is a public university located in Peshawar, Khyber Pakhtunkhwa, Pakistan. Formerly known as NWFP University of Engineering and Technology until 2010, it an institution of higher learning in Pakistan with a strong emphasis on the development of science and engineering.

Its programs of civil engineering includes research in the interdiscipline of earthquake studies, started after the massive earthquake jolted the country in 2005. The university offers undergraduate and post-graduate programs in various engineering disciplines. The university is also a member of the Association of Commonwealth Universities of the United Kingdom.  The university is regarded as one of the best engineering schools in the country and is ranked in 7th position nationwide in the category of "Engineering and Technology" by HEC, the highest governing body of higher education in Pakistan. In addition, the university has been retaining its position among the top institutions of science and engineering in the country for a long time.

History

Name 
In 1952, an engineering college was set up as a constituent college of the University of Peshawar with an enrollment of twenty students (according to the UET Peshawar Annual Report 2006 – 2007). This college was granted a charter to operate as an independent engineering university in 1980 under the name University of Engineering and Technology. It was officially known as the NWFP University of Engineering and Technology Peshawar until 2010 when the province name was changed to Khyber-Pakhtunkhwa (KPK). Colloquially, it has been referred to as UET Peshawar since its establishment.

Campus 
UET Peshawar has five campuses. Peshawar campus is the main campus with four satellite campuses in Kohat, Abbottabad, Bannu and Jalozai.

Peshawar campus 
The main campus is in the University Campus area, University Road, Peshawar. The Peshawar campus is the nucleus of the university. The following programs are offered in the Peshawar campus. 
 B.Sc/M. Sc/Ph.D  Agriculture Engineering 
 B.Sc/M. Sc/Ph.D  Architecture 
 B.Sc/M. Sc/Ph.D  Chemical Engineering 
 B.Sc/M. Sc/Ph.D  Civil Engineering 
 B.Sc/M. Sc/Ph.D  Computer Science & IT 
 B.Sc/M. Sc/Ph.D  Computer Systems Engineering 
 B.Sc/M. Sc/Ph.D  Electrical Engineering 
 B.Sc. Electronics Engineering 
 B.Sc/M. Sc/Ph.D  Industrial Engineering 
 B.Sc/M. Sc/Ph.D  Mechanical Engineering 
 B.Sc/M. Sc/Ph.D  Mechatronics Engineering 
 B.Sc/M. Sc/Ph.D  Mining Engineering 
 B.Sc/M. Sc/Ph.D  Software Engineering 
 B.Sc/M. Sc/Ph.D  Telecommunication Engineering

Jalozai Campus 
Jalozai Campus was inaugurated in December 2017 by Chief Minister Khyber Pakhtunkhwa and Governor Sardar Mahtab Ahmed Khan. The campus funded by HEC at the cost of Rs. 6,565,272 million PKR is established on Pabbi Cherat Road at 11 km Southwards from GT Road in Nowshera District. Total area of the campus is 402 acres and the total covered area is approximately 1,021,233 sq. ft. with almost 3240 students. At present, Jalozai Campus is offering the following programs.

 B.Sc. Civil Engineering 
 B.Sc. Electrical Engineering 
 B.Sc. Industrial Engineering 
 B.Sc. Mechanical Engineering 
 Computer Science & IT

Abbottabad campus 
The Abbottabad campus was inaugurated in October 2002 at the premises of the old Ayub Medical College. The campus has two departments, Electronics and Architecture. The campus started Electronic Engineering subjects for the first time in UET history. In this respect, its first Batch (2004 to 2008) is called the "Pioneer Batch". Similarly architecture was not only started for the first time in the history of UET Peshawar but also in history of Khyber Pakhtunkhwa.

Abbottabad campus is located in the heart of city surrounded by lush green lawns and tall trees. At the background, there is a mountain view adding more grandeur to the campus.
The departments offers the following four- and five-year degree program respectively:
 B.Sc. Electronics Engineering (four-year program)
 B.Architecture, City and Regional Planning (five-year program)

Bannu campus 
The Bannu campus became operational in May 2002 at the premises of Comprehensive High School. The campus offers engineering in two technologies, i.e., Electrical and Civil Engineering. The campus is in the east of the city on D.I Khan Rd. Six batches have graduated from this campus under the accreditation of Pakistan Engineering Council.

Mardan campus 

It is one of the first satellite campus of UET Peshawar, which became a full-fledged university in March 2018.
 B.Sc. Telecom Engineering,
 M.Sc. Telecom Engineering
 PhD Telecom Engineering
 B.Sc. Software Engineering
 M.Sc. Software Engineering
 PhD Software Engineering
 B.Sc. Electrical Engineering(Communication)
 B.Sc. Electrical Engineering(Power)

Kohat campus 
The Kohat campus became operational in March 2012 at the premises of Kohat University's city campus. The campus offers engineering in electrical engineering. The campus is situated on Pindi road, Kohat. Currently, the campus is offering - B.Sc. Electrical Engineering (Communication)

Organization 
UET Peshawar is a public university run by the provincial government. Admissions to the university depend on whether the applicants live in the Khyber-Pakhtunkhwa province. There are some quota categories that would enable students from the Federally Administered Tribal Areas (FATA) and other provinces of Pakistan to enroll.

The head of UET Peshawar is designated as Vice Chancellor, appointed by the Governor of Khyber-Pakhtunkhwa and mandated to run the university. The Vice Chancellor is Dr. Iftikhar Hussain.

There are several senior staff posts that report directly to the Vice Chancellor. These include:
 Registrar of university
 Dean of university
 Director Finance
 Provost of university
 Director Post Graduate Studies
 Director of Works

The Department Heads for academic areas report to the Dean's Office.

Academics

Departments 
UET Peshawar offers Bachelor, Master and Doctoral degrees in engineering disciplines. Some of the main departments at UET Peshawar are:
 Department of Agricultural Engineering
 Department of Civil Engineering
 Department of Computer Systems Engineering
 Department of Chemical Engineering
 Department of Electrical Engineering
 Department of Mechanical Engineering
 Department of Industrial Engineering
 Department of Mining Engineering
 Department of Telecommunication Engineering
 Department of Electronics Engineering
 Department of Architecture
 Department of Computer Science and Information Technology
 Department of Basic Sciences and Islamiat
 Department of Mechatronics Engineering

Societies at UET Peshawar  
Directorate of Clubs and Societies is the umbrella under which other clubs work including technical society and extra-curricular clubs. Drama Club (Stage), Hiking and Trekking Club, Environmental Club are major extra-curricular clubs. Programs such as dramas, debates, seminars, exhibitions and trekking, computing and computer game contests are arranged annually in the university. Other major technical society clubs include:
 Institution of Civil Engineers (ICE)
 IEEE UET Peshawar sub-section
 American Society of Mechanical Engineers (ASME)
 Institute of Industrial Engineers (IIE)
 Robotics and Automation Society (RAS)

Ranking 
UET Peshawar is ranked 5th in the field of IT/Engineering by the Higher Education Commission of Pakistan which is the highest regulatory government body of higher education institutes in the country.

Semester system 
In 2004, UET Peshawar moved from an annual system of examination to the semester system. The system was brought by the vice chancellor, Syed Imtiaz Hussain Gillani. There are two semesters in an academic year – Fall and Spring. Each semester consists of 18 weeks of teaching and two exams- mid term and final term. Mid term carries 25% and the final term carries 50% of the total in any subject offered in a semester. The rest of the 25% is awarded on the basis of class participation, assignments and quizzes. Fall semester starts around September, whereas spring semester starts around February.

Tenure Track System 
In 2006, UET Peshawar introduced the Tenure Track System which is a performance-based pay system.

Selection Procedure 
Being a public university with limited number of seats, entrance to UET Peshawar is competed tremendously nationwide by the brightest students annually. It conducts ETEA test for selection procedure each year. In 2016, about 15000 candidates appeared for the entrance test to undergraduate programs.

Research Centers  
The following centers at the university conduct researches which are funded by the government agency and HEC.

Earthquake Engineering Center (EEC) 
Earthquake Engineering Center (EEC) is a multidisciplinary research and education center. Envisioned in 2002, the center became operational in June 2006. EEC was established with the aim of better understanding the seismic risk in the areas within the geographical boundaries of Pakistan and to conduct research and testing in the current construction practices in Pakistan for improving seismic resistance of structures in high seismic risk areas. In the aftermath of the October 8, 2005 earthquake in Pakistan, the center proved itself as a reliable and proficient institution that provided valuable suggestions and guidance to the government and non-government organizations involved in the reconstruction and rehabilitation.

National Institute of Urban Infrastructure Planning (NIUIP) 
National Institute of Urban Infrastructure Planning, the brainchild of Dr. Murtaza Haider (Asst. Prof. McGill University 2002–2006, Assoc. Prof. Ryerson University (now Toronto Metropolitan University) 2006-current) is established at UET Peshawar with the grant of US$3.0 million from Higher Education Commission (Pakistan) (HEC) of Pakistan. Main focus of NIUIP is to address the persistent urban decay and research in improvement of urban infrastructure of Pakistan.
Initial research focus of NIUIP is in:

 Infrastructure finance and planning
 Urban transportation planning
 Urban environment and energy planning
 Water supply and sanitation
 Solid waste management
 Spatial modeling and GIS

Center of Intelligent Systems & Networks Research (CISNR) 
Center of Intelligent Systems & Networks Research (CISNR) conducts research primarily on smart grid and intelligent transportation systems based on wireless sensor networks and IoT devices. CISNR has several partnerships with different National and International organizations.

 HUAMET, NASYS China Holding Limited, China
 INSTECH Enterprises, Pakistan
 Webprenuer Academy, UK
 GOVCHINA International Information Technology Research Institute (Beijing), China
 Beijing Global Safety Technology Corporation Limited, China

U.S.-Pakistan Center for Advanced Studies in Energy (USPCAS-E) 
USPCAS-E is a partnership between Arizona State University and two leading Pakistani universities: the NUST and the UET Peshawar. It is a major energy research project funded by USAID in Pakistan dealing with applied and joint research with UET Peshawar. Scholars who attends UET Peshawar are selected to attend Arizona State University for further studies on sustainable energy and photovoltaics. The students and faculty engages in experimental research on energy at Arizona State University labs under the supervision of professors to design, execute and analyze experiments in areas such as solar panels and batteries. They also take part in industrial visits to learn more about power generation mechanisms in the United States. Under the umbrella of the Higher Education Commission of Pakistan, the USPCAS-E at UET Peshawar conducts sustainable energy research, producing the next generation of technologies in the field of applied energy research.

Scalable Transmission of Adaptive Multimedia based on P2P (STAMP) Center 
This center conducts research on P2P video transmission and data communication. STAMP, an open source modular P2P streaming system optimized for the networking conditions of Pakistan. Scalability in the context of STAMP refers to both scalability in terms of support for accommodating any number of users on the fly and also scalability in terms of support for the simultaneous transmission of different video quality levels.

Academic linkages 
UET Peshawar has joint research, faculty and student training and exchange programs with foreign universities including Arizona State University, Asian Institute of Technology (Thailand), Strathclyde University (UK), McGill University (Canada), George Washington University (United States),  University of Petronas (Malaysia) and University of Liverpool (UK). In 2016, MoU was signed between UET Peshawar and Arizona State University to exchange students under the program of U.S.-Pakistan Center for Advanced Studies in Energy (USPCAS-E). Students from UET Peshawar spend a semester in the United States to carry out energy research at the laboratories of Arizona State University. The exchange visits, coordinated through the USAID-funded U.S.-Pakistan Centers for Advanced Studies in Energy (USPCAS-E), provides faculty the opportunity to upgrade their teaching and corporate-partnership skills and offers the students of UET Peshawar an opportunity to enhance their research skills and industry awareness.

Research areas 
The research activities at UET Peshawar include:
 Mechanical design
 Design of earthquake resisting structures
 Mining techniques
 Processing of low grade industrial minerals and metallic ores
 Environmental management
 Water resources management
 Application of computers in engineering.

Library 
The university library contains a collection of books and manuscripts related to engineering and computing disciplines. The library allows students access to electronic journals under a “Digital Library Program”, a Higher Education Council (HEC) funded project for both public and private universities. Moreover, the university provides free books to the students for a semester period.

Student life 

The university offers on campus housing for its students. It has separate hostels for girls and boys. It also has a separate hostel for its foreign students. The university has almost 150 foreign students studying in various departments, most of which are from Middle East and Africa. The student life in hostels mostly revolve around visiting friends, outdoor activities like football, cricket, basketball, badminton, tennis, handball and other sports during afternoon at the beautiful large playground of Islamia College and surrounding facilities. The campus has several other playgrounds besides that and it is significantly attractive because of large number of trees.

Development projects 
UET Peshawar's development projects portfolio crossed 2 billion rupees in 2006–2007, according to the UET Peshawar Annual Report 2006 – 2007). Some of the key development projects that UET Peshawar is working on include: 
 National Institute of Urban Infrastructure Planning (NIUIP, Pakistan):
          Funding agency:  Higher Education Commission of Pakistan
          Funding amount:  Pakistani Rupees 174 million
          Funding purpose: to establish a new institute
 Institute of Mechatronics Engineering:
          Funding agency:  Higher Education Commission of Pakistan
          Funding amount:  Pakistani Rupees 148 million
          Funding purpose: to establish a new institute
 Earthquake Engineering Center:
          Funding agency:  Higher Education Commission of Pakistan
          Funding amount:  Pakistani Rupees 487 million
          Funding purpose: upgrade the Earthquake Engineering Center
 Department of Industrial Engineering:
          Funding agency:  Higher Education Commission of Pakistan
          Funding amount:  Covered under "Strengthening and Updating of Peshawar Campus"
          Funding purpose: to establish a new department
 Gemstone Development Center:
          Funding agency:  Higher Education Commission of Pakistan
          Funding amount:  Pakistani Rupees 33 million
          Funding purpose: to establish a research facility within the Mining Engineering Department
 New campus site near Jallozai, Peshawar: submission of PC-1 for this  campus is under way.
          Funding agency:  unknown
          Funding amount:  unknown
          Funding purpose: to establish a new main campus and move existing main Peshawar campus to a  site near Jallozai, Peshawar
 Continuing Engineering Education Center:
          Funding agency:  Higher Education Commission of Pakistan
          Funding amount:  Pakistani Rupees 25 million
          Funding purpose: to establish a center for professional development of faculty
 Strengthening and updating of Peshawar Campus:
          Funding agency:  Higher Education Commission of Pakistan
          Funding amount:  Pakistani Rupees 479 million
          Funding purpose: capacity building, constructing department of Industrial Engineering and Human Resources Department for faculty members training and higher education in foreign countries.
 New co-ed hostel:
          Funding agency:  Higher Education Commission of Pakistan
          Funding amount:  Pakistani Rupees 37 million
          Funding purpose: to establish an on-campus residence for co-ed students

References

External links
 UET Peshawar official website

University of Engineering & Technology, Peshawar
Educational institutions established in 1952
1952 establishments in Pakistan